Miss Universo Chile 2014, the 51st Miss Universo Chile pageant, was held on December 8, 2014. María Jesús Matthei crowned Hellen Toncio as her successor at end of the event. Hellen will represent Chile at Miss Universe 2014 pageant to be held in Miami, United States.

Delegates 
The 15 official delegates were selected on October 26.

Final results

Special awards
 Miss Popularidad 2014 - Ivana Simunovic

Notes
 Miss Rapa Nui was held on September 12 in Hotel Hanga Roa, Rapa Nui. The judges were María Jesús Matthei, Marlen Olivari,  Juan Sastre (National Director of Miss Universo Chile), Manoa Frugé-Terorotua (Miss Tahiti) and Hetu'u Rapu (Miss Universo Chile 1997), among others. The winner was Veri Irene Teave.
 Francisca Barrera and Tamara Bernales were finalists in the Miss Earth Chile 2014 pageant. 
 Jocelyn Talamilla was crowned "Miss Antofagasta 2014" on March, 2014, and also she represented Chile in Miss Sea World 2013, in Perú, where she became the 2nd runner-up.
 María Belén Jerez and Francisca Barrera withdrew from the competition.
 Valentina Schnitzer won Miss Supranational Chile 2015 pageant.
 Natividad Leiva won Miss Earth Chile 2015 pageant and finished Top 8 in Miss Earth 2015 and also won Miss Universo Chile 2017 pageant.
 María Belén Jerez was appointed as Miss Universo Chile 2015.

References

External links
 Official Miss Universo Chile website
 Official Miss Universo Chile Facebook
 Official Miss Rapa Nui Facebook

Miss Universo Chile
2014 in Chile
2014 beauty pageants